The 1933 Boston University Terriers football team was an American football team that represented Boston University as an independent during the 1933 college football season. In its first and only season under head coach John Harmon, the team compiled a 2–5 record and was outscored by a total of 105 to 41.

Schedule

References

Boston University
Boston University Terriers football seasons
Boston University football